Kevin Anderson and Ryler DeHeart won in the final 3–6, 7–6(7–2), [15–13] against Im Kyu-tae and Martin Slanar.

Seeds

Draw

Draw

References

External links
Main Draw
Qualifying Draw

Honolulu Challenger - Doubles
2010 Doubles